Puerto Supe, officially known as Supe Puerto (to distinguish it from the neighboring district of Supe Pueblo, a separate municipality), is a small harbor town located in the province of Barranca, in the Lima Provincias region, on the coast of Peru. It is located approximately 190 km north of Lima, and is part of the Supe Valley.

Puerto Supe is known for having one of the oldest archaeological sites in the Americas. The archaeological site of El Áspero has been dated at over 3000 BCE, and is part of a complex of 20 sites spread throughout the Supe Valley that constitute the oldest known civilization in the Americas: The Norte Chico, or Caral-Supe, civilization.

The town also boasts a lighthouse and a virtually intact, protected beach where the main attraction is a tidal island known as Isla del Faraón (Pharaoh's Island) that is surrounded by water as the tide rises in the late afternoon (cf. Mont Saint-Michel in Normandy, France). In recent years, however, the sea seems to have receded (or the ground risen), so that the water now forms an island only occasionally, on the highest tides.

Climate

Gallery

References

External links 
  Municipal website
 Images from Puerto Supe, Peru

Populated places in the Lima Region
Andean preceramic